Events from the year 1867 in Scotland.

Incumbents

Law officers 
 Lord Advocate – George Patton until February; then Edward Strathearn Gordon
 Solicitor General for Scotland – Edward Strathearn Gordon; then John Millar

Judiciary 
 Lord President of the Court of Session and Lord Justice General – Lord Colonsay until 25 February; then Lord Glencorse
 Lord Justice Clerk – Lord Glenalmond, then Lord Moncreiff

Events 
 29 April – the Caledonian Mercury newspaper is last published.
 9 July – Queen's Park F.C., Scotland's first senior football club, is formed.
 29 August – John Hill Burton is appointed Historiographer Royal.
 28 November – opening of Baylis's Royal Colosseum Theatre and Opera House, Glasgow, which becomes the Theatre Royal, Glasgow in May 1869.
 Edinburgh Crystal glass is first manufactured, by the Edinburgh and Leith Flint Glass Company.
 The West of Scotland Grand National, predecessor of the Scottish Grand National, moves to a new course, Bogside Racecourse near Irvine, North Ayrshire.

Births 
 26 April – William Barr, landscape painter (died 1933 in the United States)
 3 June – George Henry Walton, architect and designer (died 1933 in London)
 1 August – William Speirs Bruce, naturalist, polar scientist and oceanographer (died 1921)
 9 August – Henrietta Elizabeth Marshall, writer of history for children (died 1941 in London)
 26 August – Robert William Hamilton, colonial judge and Liberal politician (died 1944)

Deaths 
 5 January – Alexander Smith, poet (born 1829)
 16 January – Alexander Gibson, surgeon and forest conservator in India (born 1800)
 9 February – John Campbell, surgeon (born 1784)
 24 June – Horatio McCulloch, landscape painter (born 1806)

The arts 
 January – Clara Schumann and Joseph Joachim tour to Edinburgh and Glasgow.

See also 
 Timeline of Scottish history
 1867 in the United Kingdom

References 

 
Years of the 19th century in Scotland
Scotland
1860s in Scotland